John Shafto (8 November 1918 – 1978) was an English footballer who played as a striker. Shafto played for Liverpool prior to World War II, making 20 appearances and scoring 7 goals. He also played for Brighton & Hove Albion F.C.

References

1918 births
1978 deaths
English Football League players
Brighton & Hove Albion F.C. players
English footballers
Liverpool F.C. players
Association football forwards